Lay Phyu (born 19 May 1965) is a Burmese rock star and guitarist. He is the lead vocalist of the rock band Iron Cross. Lay is considered the most commercially successful male singer in the history of Burmese rock music.

Biography
Lay Phyu was born on 19 May 1965 in Inlay Lake, Shan State, Myanmar along with his younger brother Ah Nge. He attended and graduated from Mandalay University with an English Major where he met Y Wine, one of the aspiring singers from the Iron Cross Music band (a rock band in Myanmar). He eventually joined the "Iron Cross" band, which was founded by Saw Bwe Hmu, a guitarist and songwriter. Later, Chit San Maung became the lead guitarist after Bwe Hmu passed away. Later Ah Nge, Myo Gyi and Y Wine joined the new band.

Since his early career days, Lay Phyu became successful in his first album "Gandarya Lamin" (Desert Moon) and helped define the genre of Burmese rock music. Much of his music was inspired by bands such as Nazareth, Metallica, Van Halen, Scorpion, Dream Theatre, and Bon Jovi. Lay Phyu first started his path to fame when he covered English songs in Burmese. Later on, as he gained confidence and popularity in his music career, he began to compose a few of his own music. Even with the copy songs written together with his Iron Cross associates, Lay Phyu gave a fresh boost to Myanmar's Music Industry.

Charity and outreach
In 2008, when Cyclone Nargis struck the South Western regions of Myanmar, Iron Cross as well as many other famous artists formed a collaboration of songs as to raise funds to help victims rebuild their livelihoods. An organization from California sponsored the charity and published a song called "Hands with love" .The collaboration then proceeded to perform "Hands with love" by written by Raggie, raising awareness to Myanmar locals of the damage that natural disasters can cause to people's social, economic and environmental factors.
The same anonymous sponsor published and performed a song "a yay ma kyi bue" ( Not the end of the world ) in the same year, dedicated towards his twin daughters he had lost.

Lay Phyu in USA
Lay Phyu shot a new music video in Ocean City, MD for his new upcoming album. The video was shot in late 2012 by Burmese director Danyar. The title for the track is called "". Another music video, Yote Thein Pay, also featured footage of recording sessions and 2012 USA Tour.

( Photos from the set)

Discography

Solo albums
  (Desert Moon)
  (Cries of the Sea)
  (Live)
  (Music Entity)
 Power 54
  (Song of New World)
  (Curse)
  (The Prey)
  (Dream Poem)
  (The Butterfly)
  (The Mummies)
  (The Moments)
 Bay of Bengal (BOB)
 Diary – Single (music) (Released at 27-10-2013)
 Diary – Album (Released at 27-12-2014)
 Dar A Chit Lar (Single)
 Zar Ti Boone ( single)

Collaborations
 95 Myanmar Billboard Top Hits
  (2)
 
 
 
 
 Iron Cross Band Unplugged
 Iron Cross Band Acoustic
  (2)
 
 LMN
 We Love the SEA Games (2013)
 Six Strings Witch

References

1965 births
Living people
Burmese singer-songwriters
Burmese Buddhists
21st-century Burmese male singers
20th-century Burmese male singers
People from Shan State
Mandalay University alumni